Dargov (1948-1964 Drahov) is a village and municipality in the Trebišov District in the Košice Region of eastern Slovakia.

History 
The village was first mentioned as Dorgo in a charter in 1458.  It belonged to several owners: the nobles Semsey and Széchy, the castle of Sečovce (Csapy family), and a part to the town of Trebišov. In the 19th century it belonged to the noble landowners Andrássy, Berzeviczy and Forgách. In 1944 it was burned down by the German Army.

Genealogical resources

The records for genealogical research are available at the state archive "Statny Archiv in Kosice, Slovakia"

See also
 List of municipalities and towns in Slovakia

References

External links
Surnames of living people in Dargov

Villages and municipalities in Trebišov District
Zemplín (region)
Andrássy family
Berzeviczy family
Forgách family